The 1963 Central Michigan Chippewas football team represented Central Michigan University in the Interstate Intercollegiate Athletic Conference (IIAC) during the 1963 NCAA College Division football season.  In their 13th season under head coach Kenneth Kelly, the Chippewas compiled a 4–5–1 record (2–2 against IIAC opponents) and outscored their opponents by a combined total of 209 to 195.

The team's statistical leaders included quarterback Pat Boyd with 817 passing yards, Bill Shuple with 693 rushing yards, and halfback Larry Moore with 397 receiving yards. Halfback Chuck Koons received the team's most valuable player award. Four Central Michigan players (Larry Moore, offensive guard Ken Bickel, linebacker Frank Goldberg, and offensive tackle Tom Lang) received first-team honors on the All-IIAC team.

Schedule

References

Central Michigan
Central Michigan Chippewas football seasons
Central Michigan Chippewas football